Thomas Helm (2 September 1885 - 11 August 1950) was a Scottish rugby union and professional rugby league footballer who played in the 1900s and 1910s. He played representative level rugby union (RU) for South of Scotland, and at club level for Hawick RFC, and selected to play representative level rugby league (RL) for Great Britain (no appearances), and at club level for Oldham (Heritage No. 129), and Coventry (no appearances), as a forward (prior to the specialist positions of), during the era of contested scrums.

Playing career

International honours
Tom Helm represented South of Scotland (RU) while at Hawick, and was selected for Great Britain (RL) while at Oldham for the 1910 Great Britain Lions tour of Australia and New Zealand. However, a knee injury sustained prior to departing on the tour, was exacerbated by a tug of war competition with the passengers on-board the Peninsular and Oriental Steam Navigation Company (P&O) steamship SS Malwa, consequently he played no matches during the tour, and he would not play for Oldham until December 1910.

Club career
Tom Helm's final match for Oldham took place against Runcorn during April of the 1910–11 Northern Rugby Football Union season, at the end of that season, along with other Oldham players, he signed for Coventry, but he does not appear to have played any matches for Coventry.

Death

His death is noted as 11 August 1950.

His death was reported in the Hawick Express edition of 16 August 1950.
Mr Tom Helm, who was a noted forward with the " Greens " about the 1908 period, and who later went to the Northern Union game and travelled to Australia and New Zealand with a British touring team, has died suddenly in Sydney, Australia, at the age of 65. Mr Helm had lived in Australia for about 25 years, and in the Second World War served as a Sergeant-Major in the Australian Army. He leaves a wife and a married son and daughter.
His death was also reported in the Hawick News and Border Chronicle edition of 18 August 1950.
Mr Tom Helm, well-known Greens forward about 40 years ago, has died in Sydney. Australia. He was 65 years of age, and at one time toured Australia and New Zealand with British Northern Union Rugby team. He is survived by his wife, a son and daughter.

References

External links
Search for "Helm" at rugbyleagueproject.org (RL)
Search for "Helm" at espnscrum.com (RU)
(archived by web.archive.org) Statistics at orl-heritagetrust.org.uk

1885 births
1950 deaths
Great Britain national rugby league team players
Hawick RFC players
Oldham R.L.F.C. players
Place of birth missing
Place of death missing
Rugby league forwards
Rugby league players from Hawick
Rugby union forwards
Rugby union players from Hawick
Scottish rugby league players
Scottish rugby union players
South of Scotland District (rugby union) players